Arthur Scoullar (1830s–1899) was the  Mayor of Dunedin in 1888.

Scoullar was born in Ayrshire in the 1830s, and was sent to work early at the age of 7, making Kilmarnock bonnets. He later completed a cabinet making apprenticeship, and then in 1854 emigrated to Melbourne. After failing to make his fortune on the Victorian goldfields, he crossed to Otago, where he did well on the Central Otago diggings. Scoullar established himself in business in Dunedin in 1863, founding the firm North and Scoullar, which later developed into Scoullar & Chisholm, furniture warehousemen. In 1882, Scoullar's 17-year-old daughter died of typhoid fever.

Scoullar was elected to the city council, and served a term as Mayor from 1888 to 1889.

A Wellington branch of the firm was opened, and it was in that city that Scoullar died in June 1899, after a brief illness. He was survived by his wife and at least one son.

References 

Mayors of Dunedin
1830s births
1899 deaths
Year of birth uncertain